Elios Andreini (8 September 1940 – 8 June 2022) was an Italian politician.

Biography 
Elios Andreini was born on 8 September 1940 in Bagnacavallo, Italy. Already a teacher, he was Senator for the Communist Party from 9 July 1987 to 22 April 1992.

Andreini was the author of local history books. He died in Adria on 8 June 2022, at the age of 81.

References

External links 
 Elios Andreini at Senato della Repubblica

1940 births
2022 deaths
20th-century Italian politicians
21st-century Italian politicians
Italian Communist Party politicians
Democratic Party of the Left politicians
Democrats of the Left politicians
Senators of Legislature X of Italy
Senators of Legislature XI of Italy
People from the Province of Ravenna